"Simple Explanation" is the 20th episode of the fifth season of House. It first aired on April 6, 2009.

Plot
As Eddie Novack (Meat Loaf) lies on his deathbed, his wife Charlotte is stricken with respiratory failure. The team takes Charlotte's case and wheels Eddie into her room, as he seems to gain strength when he sees her suffering. Taub suggests she could have picked up something in Hawaii when she went there, and Foreman suggests melioidosis. They start her on an IV drip and aciclovir, which works, until she starts gasping. Thirteen suggests polyserositis, so the team starts Charlotte on indomethacin. In the meantime, Taub does a hormone panel on Eddie which turns out normal, so he does an echo-cardiogram on him as well to see if his heart's improving, but it isn't.

Unusually, Kutner does not show up for work, and House dispatches Thirteen and Foreman to check his apartment. Thirteen finds Kutner's body; he has died by suicide. The team must then try to save Charlotte while struggling to make sense of Kutner's death. House, Thirteen and Foreman go to see Kutner's parents, but House blames the parents and leaves. Taub seems to show little interest in Kutner's death. Cuddy tells the team she's hired a grief counselor and offers them time off. She then goes to talk to Wilson, who hasn't been with House yet. Wilson goes with House to Kutner's home. House looks around and finally suspects that someone murdered Kutner. House suspects it was the same person who killed Kutner's birth parents.

House eventually realizes Charlotte feigned her illness, but then her liver fails. Thirteen does an MRI on her, but her spleen ruptures in the middle of it. House thinks she could have Alpha 1-antitrypsin deficiency, so Thirteen and Taub run her AAT proteins. Foreman takes time off. Her proteins come back normal. She then tries to take her own life by overdosing so that Eddie can have her heart.

The team manages to stabilize Charlotte, but the drugs she took damaged her liver. House gets Cameron to convince Eddie to do a partial liver transplant. With his failing heart, he's bound to die on the table. Then they can give his whole liver to Charlotte, which is what she needs, not part of one. House gets Cameron to convince Eddie to do this. He wants to say goodbye to her, but Cameron notes she would never agree to this if she knew what would happen. As Eddie signs off on the transplant, Cameron notices nodules on Eddie's fingers, which could indicate that his condition might be curable. Meanwhile, House finds out that the murderer of Kutner's birth parents died of an aneurysm two months before. Eddie still wants to proceed with the liver donation, but Taub reveals to Charlotte that Eddie can be cured. House realizes Charlotte was in Rio without telling Eddie, where she contracted visceral leishmaniasis. The team starts her on antimony.

The episode ends with Cameron, Chase, Foreman, Thirteen, Cuddy, Wilson, Kutner's parents and many other people attending Kutner's funeral. Foreman takes Thirteen's hand as they watch Kutner's body be cremated. Before Cuddy leaves for the funeral, Taub says that they diagnosed Charlotte too late and she will die. Cuddy offers Taub a ride; he refuses, saying he will stay with Charlotte. Cuddy says that Charlotte's death bought them more time to save Eddie and to transplant her heart which will give her death meaning, but Taub says it won't. Taub stays with Charlotte and Eddie until she dies. Then he is shown sitting in the corridor finally breaking down crying at the loss of his friend. House goes to Kutner's apartment and looks through a pile of photos of Kutner looking happy until he finds one of Kutner looking off into the distance depressed.

Kutner's death
Kutner's suicide was scripted due to actor Kal Penn's decision to accept the position of Associate Director of the White House Office of Public Liaison in President Barack Obama's administration.

Critical reception
Leading up to the premiere of "Simple Explanation", Fox aired commercials suggesting that the episode would contain a major event, calling the episode, "beyond words". Kutner's death was criticized in The Star-Ledger, with columnist Alan Sepinwall arguing that the death was pointless, and seemingly written only to create a "Very Special Episode." The A.V. Club praised the episode for its surprising twist, but also claimed that the sudden death of a major character for no discernible reason was "a dramatic cheap shot". However, Entertainment Weekly commended the show's handling of the death, believing that it was presented in a dramatically effective and realistic manner.

Music
 "Lose You" by Pete Yorn, played at the end of the episode.

References

External links 
 

House (season 5) episodes
2009 American television episodes
Television episodes about suicide
Television episodes about funerals

fr:Il n'y a rien à comprendre
it:Episodi di Dr. House - Medical Division (quinta stagione)#Una spiegazione semplice